The China National Highway 110 traffic jam was a recurring traffic jam that began to form on 13 August 2010, mostly on China National Highway 110 (G110) and Beijing–Tibet expressway (G6), in Hebei and Inner Mongolia. Many drivers were able to move their vehicles only 1 km (0.6 mi) per day, and some drivers reported being stuck in the traffic jam for five days. It is considered to be one of the longest traffic jams by some media.

Cause
Traffic on the China National Highway 110 had grown 40 percent every year in the previous several years, making the highway chronically congested. The traffic volume at the time of the incident was 60% more than the design capacity.

The cause of the traffic jam was reported to be a spike in traffic by heavy trucks heading to Beijing, along with National Highway 110's maintenance work that began five days later. The road construction which reduced the road capacity by 50% contributed heavily to the traffic jam and was not due to be completed until mid-September. Police reported that minor breakdowns and accidents were compounding the problem.

Greatly increased coal production in Inner Mongolia was transported to Beijing along this route because of the lack of railway capacity, which overloaded the highway. 602 million tons of coal were mined and transported in 2009; production was expected to rise to 730 million tons in 2010. An additional factor is efforts by overloaded trucks that lacked proper paperwork for their cargo to avoid a coal quality supervision and inspection station on China National Highway 208.

Effect and end
Locals near the highway sold various goods like water, instant noodles, and cigarettes at inflated prices to the stranded drivers. A bottle of water normally cost 1 yuan, but on the highway it was sold for 15 yuan. Drivers also complained that the price of instant noodles had more than tripled. Some vendors created mobile stores on bicycles.

Authorities tried to speed up traffic by allowing more trucks to enter Beijing, especially at night. They also asked trucking companies to suspend operations or take alternative routes.

By late August 2010, the traffic jam had largely dissipated, reportedly due to the efforts of authorities. Between Beijing and Inner Mongolia, only minor traffic slowdowns were reported near toll booths.

References

External links
China Traffic Jam Vanishes Overnight
Beijing Embraces Car-Free Day in Traffic Jams | China Digital Times (CDT)

2010 in China
2010 road incidents
Road transport in China
Road traffic management
Road incidents in China